Charlie McAlister is a former Scotland international rugby league footballer who played as a professional in England and Australia.

Playing career
McAlister played for the Newcastle Knights in 1988. He then moved to England and played rugby union for Bradford and Bingley Rugby Club before signing with Oldham, and returning to rugby league. He played for Oldham between 1988/89 and 1991/92, becoming the club's vice captain. McAlister earned a Kiwi trial in 1989. McAlister then spent the 1992/93 season with the Sheffield Eagles before returning to Oldham for the 1993/94 season.

McAlister also played for the Castleford Tigers, and was later the coach of the Manawatu Rugby Union team. In 1995 he played for Scotland at the Emerging Nations Tournament.

He is also father of All Black and Blues player Luke McAlister, and northern mystics player Kayla McAlister. He currently acts as Luke's manager.

References

Charlie McAlister also was a Taranaki Rugby Football Union Representative playing 78 games, as well as playing for the Maori All Blacks

External links
Career Stats & Summary of Charlie McAlister

1963 births
Living people
New Zealand Māori rugby league players
New Zealand rugby league players
New Zealand rugby union players
New Zealand expatriate sportspeople in England
Newcastle Knights players
Oldham R.L.F.C. players
Petone Panthers players
Scotland national rugby league team players
Sheffield Eagles players
Taranaki rugby league team players
Wellington rugby league team players